West Dryden Methodist Episcopal Church is a historic Methodist Episcopal church located at Dryden in Tompkins County, New York. It is a two-story, frame church structure built in 1832 in the Federal style.  It was remodeled during 1870–1890. It features a tower with an octagonal belfry. Since 1966 it has been used as the West Dryden Community Center.

It was listed on the National Register of Historic Places in 1991.

References

External links

Churches on the National Register of Historic Places in New York (state)
Historic American Buildings Survey in New York (state)
Federal architecture in New York (state)
Churches completed in 1832
Churches in Tompkins County, New York
National Register of Historic Places in Tompkins County, New York